Tătăruși is a commune in Iași County, Western Moldavia, Romania. It is composed of five villages: Iorcani, Pietrosu, Tătăruși, Uda and Vâlcica.

References

Communes in Iași County
Localities in Western Moldavia